Harry Walter Anderson (September 10, 1931 – June 11, 1998),  nicknamed "Harry the Horse," was an American professional baseball outfielder / first baseman, who played in Major League Baseball (MLB) for the Philadelphia Phillies and Cincinnati Reds, of the National League (NL).

He batted left-handed and threw right-handed. Anderson is the last big league batter to lead the either major league with fewer than 100 strikeouts (95 in 1958).

Anderson played 484 career games from 1957 to 1961 with the Phillies and the Cincinnati Reds. Anderson's first two years in the Major Leagues were his finest.

During the 1958 campaign, in what was only Anderson's sophomore season in Philadelphia, he batted .301, with 23 home runs, and 97 runs batted in (RBI) — all career highs. González would be the Phils' starting centerfielder for much of the 1960s. Anderson, meanwhile, continued to struggle in Cincinnati and was sent to the minor leagues during the May 1961 roster cutdown.

Overall, Anderson recorded 419 career hits in 1,586 at bats with 199 runs, 60 home runs, 242 RBI and 159 walks in the Major Leagues.

In 1992, Anderson was inducted into the Delaware Sports Museum and Hall of Fame. He suffered a fatal heart attack, at his home, in Greenville, Delaware, June 11, 1998, aged 66 years.

References

External links

Harry Anderson at Baseball Almanac

1931 births
1998 deaths
People from Greenville, Delaware
Baseball players from Maryland
Cincinnati Reds players
Indianapolis Indians players
Jersey City Jerseys players
Major League Baseball outfielders
People from Cecil County, Maryland
Philadelphia Phillies players
San Diego Padres (minor league) players
Schenectady Blue Jays players
Terre Haute Phillies players
West Chester Golden Rams baseball players
Sportspeople from Maryland
Sportspeople from Delaware